The spider family Liphistiidae, recognized by Tamerlan Thorell in 1869, comprises 8 genera and about 100 species of medium-sized spiders from Southeast Asia, China, and Japan. They are among the most basal living spiders, belonging to the suborder Mesothelae. In Japan, the Kimura spider (Heptathela kimurai) is well known.

Biology

Liphistiidae are tube-dwelling spiders that construct rudimentary trap-doors. They spend most of their time here and are rarely seen above ground. They are characterized by their downward pointing, daggerlike chelicerae, and the segmented series of plates on the upper surface of the abdomen. The carapace is mostly flat, though it can be slightly elevated near the head. The eyes are distinctly clustered together on a single nodule. Anterior median eyes are small, but posterior median eyes are large and round. The lateral eyes are long and kidney-shaped. The distal leg segments have strong spines and three claws. Chelicerae are vertically attached to the cephalothorax. In the past, they were frequently believed to lack venom, but in 2010 it was shown that at least Liphistius species have venom glands.

They are active at night and live for many years. Although most species live in burrows, cave-dwelling species also fasten their retreats to the cave walls. Both burrows and retreats are sealed with woven doors. Trapdoor nests are generally built in shady areas with moss or sparse vegetation. Some make silk trip-lines radiating away from the burrow entrance. Adult males sometimes wander in search for females, but females rarely leave their burrows. The respiratory system consists only of book lungs, which could help explain why they are relatively inactive.

Systematics
Although they have downward pointing chelicerae like the Mygalomorphae, there is no close relationship between the two. It is thought that the common ancestor of all spiders was orthognath and that in the Opisthothelae, comprising Mygalomorphae (mostly tarantulas) and Araneomorphae (all other spiders), only the Araneomorphae changed their alignment of chelicerae, while the mygalomorphs retained this symplesiomorphic feature.

Phylogeny
Molecular phylogenetic studies have repeatedly shown that the family is monophyletic, at least as regards extant (living) species. The relationship between the genera is shown in the following cladogram:

In 1923, Kyukichi Kishida suggested dividing the family into two subfamilies, Liphistiinae and Heptathelinae, corresponding to the genera Liphistius and Heptathela. More genera have since been added to the family, but the subfamily division has been upheld by modern phylogenetic studies. Liphistius, the sole genus in the subfamily Liphistiinae, is found only in Southeast Asia (Laos, Myanmar, Thailand, Malaysia and Sumatra). The Heptathelinae are found further north: five genera in northern Vietnam and China and two genera in Japan and offshore islands (Okinawa, Ryukyu Islands).

Genera

, the World Spider Catalog accepts the following genera:

Ganthela Xu & Kuntner, 2015 — China
Heptathela Kishida, 1923 — Japan
Liphistius Schiödte, 1849 — Asia
Qiongthela Xu & Kuntner, 2015 — Vietnam, China
Ryuthela Haupt, 1983 — Japan
Sinothela Haupt, 2003 — China
Songthela Ono, 2000 — China, Vietnam
Vinathela Ono, 2000 — Vietnam, China

One genus of fossil spiders, Cretaceothele Wunderlich, 2015, was originally placed in this family, but it was subsequently transferred to the separate family Cretaceothelidae.

Threatened Malaysian species
Three of the Liphistius species known to exist in Malaysia are endemic to only one or two caves. The most well known is Liphistius batuensis, which is found in Batu Caves. Other species found in Malaysia include Liphistius malayanus, Liphistius murphyorum and Liphistius desultor. The Malaysian trapdoor spiders are protected by local law, though continuous threats come from loss of habitat and collection by exotic pet traders. It is believed that these species are endemic and once an isolated habitat is destroyed, the species may go extinct.

Fossil record
While some Carboniferous fossil spiders have been assigned to Mesothelae, the only fossil to be explicitly placed in the family Liphistiidae is Cretaceothele lata Wunderlich, 2015 from the Cretaceous Burmese amber of Myanmar. The fossil genus was diagnosed as having an eye-field wider than that in living species. It was later placed in its own, monotypic family.

See also
 List of Liphistiidae species

References

External links
 ARKive

 
Spider families
Spiders of Asia